Senad Lekaj (born 29 August 1989 in Shkodër) is an Albanian professional footballer who currently plays for KF Vëllaznimi.

References

1989 births
Living people
Footballers from Shkodër
Albanian footballers
Association football midfielders
KF Vllaznia Shkodër players
KS Ada Velipojë players
KF Trepça players
KS Burreli players
KS Veleçiku Koplik players
KF Tërbuni Pukë players
KS Kastrioti players
Besëlidhja Lezhë players
KF Vëllaznimi players
Kategoria Superiore players
Kategoria e Parë players
Albanian expatriate footballers
Expatriate footballers in Kosovo
Albanian expatriate sportspeople in Kosovo